The Round Table is an American prime-time soap opera television series that aired on NBC on Friday nights from September 18 to October 16, 1992.

Series 
The series is set in Washington D.C. and focuses on the lives of a group of professionals in their mid-twenties, who frequent a bar called The Round Table. (In this way, it was reminiscent of the 1985 "brat pack" film St. Elmo's Fire.) It aired at 9pm Eastern on Friday nights, and although the competition was not particularly strong (mostly Dinosaurs on ABC and the final season of Designing Women on CBS, neither of which was in the Top 25 that year), The Round Table was cancelled after just five episodes, plus two that were produced but did not air. Many of the show's stars would later surface in other projects.

The series was produced by Aaron Spelling, who had another series that premiered that fall: Melrose Place, which was a hit and ran seven seasons.

The David Bowie tune "Young Americans" served as The Round Table's theme song.

Cast 
 Stacy Haiduk as Rhea McPherson
 David Gail as Danny Burke
 Pepper Sweeney as Deveraux Jones
 Roxann Biggs as Jennifer Clemente
 Tom Bresnahan as Mitchell Clark
 Erik King as Wade Carter

Episodes

References

External links

Television series by Spelling Television
Television series by CBS Studios
American television soap operas
American primetime television soap operas
1992 American television series debuts
1992 American television series endings
NBC original programming
English-language television shows
Television shows set in Washington, D.C.